Rebecca Rosenblum (born May 23, 1978) is a Canadian author]best known for her short stories.

Life
Rosenblum was born in Hamilton, Ontario. She attended McGill University and received her Honours Bachelor of English in 2001, and in 2007 she graduated from the University of Toronto with a Master of Arts in English and Creative Writing.

In November 2007, Rosenblum was awarded the Metcalf-Rooke Award for Once, a collection of short stories. Once was officially launched on September 15, 2008, by Canadian press Biblioasis.

In February 2008, Rosenblum was announced as one of three finalists for the Writers' Trust of Canada/McClelland & Stewart Journey Prize, which is awarded annually to a new and developing writer of distinction for a short story published in a Canadian literary journal in the previous year. In Spring 2009, Rosenblum was a juror for the Journey Prize 21.

In May 2009, Once was one of three finalists for the Danuta Gleed Literary Award.  In the summer of that year, Once was longlisted for the Relit Award, and her short story "Linh Lai" was a finalist for the Canadian National Magazine Awards.

In March 2017, Rosenblum released her first novel titled So Much Love.

Works
Introduction to Journey Prize Stories 21 (as one of three jurors in the contest). Toronto: McClelland and Stewart, October 2009.
"ContEd" and "Tech Support" (short stories) Fiddlehead #240. Fredericton: Summer 2009.
"Bold Statements" (review) Canadian Notes and Queries #76. Emeryville: Summer 2009.
"Stuff They Wrote" (essay) The New Quarterly #110. Waterloo: Spring 2009.
"Night Flight" (short story) echolocation #8. Toronto: Spring 2009.
"Hello Hello" (short story) Rampike. Windsor: Fall 2008.
"Tech Support," "ContEd," and "The House on Elsbeth" (short stories) Coming Attractions. Ottawa: Oberon Press, Fall, 2008.
"Black-and-White Man" (short story) Joyland. Toronto: September 2008.
"The House on Elsbeth," "Zoom," and "Linh Lai" (short stories) The New Quarterly 107. Waterloo: Summer 2008.
"The Weatherboy" (short story) echolocation #7. Toronto: May 2008.
"Wall of Sound" (short story) Exile Quarterly 31.4. Toronto: March 2008.
"Missing (MF)" (short story) Qwerty Spring 2007. Fredericton: Summer 2007.
"Fruit Factory" (short story) The New Quarterly #102. Waterloo: April 2007 -- . Best Canadian Stories. Ottawa: Oberon Press, Fall 2008.
"At the End of Breath" (short story) Ars Medica, Vol. 3, No. 2. Toronto: Spring 2007.
"All the Ghostlies" (short story) Hart House Review 2007. Toronto: March 2007.
"Dead Boyfriend Disco" (poem) echolocation #6. Toronto: February 2007.
"Chilly Girl" (short story) Exile Quarterly 30.3. Toronto: December 2006. --. The Journey Prize Stories 19. Toronto: McClelland and Stewart, November 2007
"Grade Nine Flight" (short story) The Danforth Review #17. Toronto: December 2006. Online.

Notes

1978 births
Living people
Canadian women poets
Canadian women short story writers
Jewish Canadian writers
University of Toronto alumni
Writers from Hamilton, Ontario
21st-century Canadian women writers
21st-century Canadian poets
21st-century Canadian short story writers
McGill University alumni
21st-century Canadian novelists
Canadian women novelists